Pasir Gudang Jamek Mosque is the first mosque to have been built in Pasir Gudang, Johor, Malaysia. It is located near the lake gardens.

History
It was constructed between 1992 and 1994 by Johor Corporation.

Architecture
It was constructed in a Middle Eastern and Western style.

See also
 Islam in Malaysia

References

1994 establishments in Malaysia
Mosques in Johor
Mosques completed in 1994
Pasir Gudang
Mosque buildings with domes